Reg Strikes Back is the 21st studio album by English musician Elton John. Released in 1988, it was his self-proclaimed comeback album, and his own way of fighting back against bad press. The "Reg" in Reg Strikes Back refers to John's birth name, Reginald Kenneth Dwight. 

In the US, the album was certified gold in August 1988 by the RIAA. It was also John's third studio album in the 1980's to be placed inside the top 20 of US Billboard 200 (number 16, 1988).

Background
This was the last album that bassist Dee Murray (albeit without bass) appeared on prior to his death in 1992. Additionally, Nigel Olsson, the longtime drummer for John's band, appears (without drums) on backing vocals. John brought back record producer Chris Thomas for the album. This was the first studio album to be recorded and released after John's throat surgery the previous year. The album cover featured costumes from John's collection that he decided to put up for auction.

The tracks "I Don't Wanna Go On with You Like That" and "A Word in Spanish" peaked at No. 2 and No. 19 on the Billboard Hot 100, respectively. 

In the UK, "I Don't Wanna Go On with You Like That" was the only song from the album to reach the Top 40 there, reaching #30 as the follow-up "Town of Plenty"  and "A Word in Spanish" appears outside the Top 40 on the same chart, peaking at #74 and #91.

Cash Box said that "A Word in Spanish" is "brilliant," describing it as "a Spanish-guitar tinged ballad written with the kind of originality that John-Taupin haven't really touched since the seventies."

Tour

After taking over a year off (to recover from throat surgery, address personal issues and record Reg Strikes Back in London), John returned to the stage with a new rhythm section. He wanted more of an R&B sound to his material, so drummer Jonathan Moffett and bassist Romeo Williams, along with backing singers Marlena Jeter, Natalie Jackson and Alex Brown, were added to the band. Guitarist Davey Johnstone, now also in the role of music director, had assembled the new band, a task that he continues to do.

The band's first show was at an AIDS benefit at the Century Plaza Hotel in Los Angeles, where they played a 14-song set that featured the never-released John/Taupin composition, "Love Is Worth Waiting For". The US tour then began on 9 September at the Miami Arena in Miami, Florida and concluded on 22 October at New York's Madison Square Garden.

After recording the follow-up album Sleeping With The Past in Denmark, the band (now with backing vocalist Mortonette Jenkins instead of Alex Brown) resumed their tour on 20 March 1989 at La Halle Tony Garnier in Lyon, France, and played across Eastern Europe and the UK, concluding on 10 June 1989 at the RDS Arena in Dublin.

Track listing

 Sides one and two were combined as tracks 1–10 on CD reissues.

Personnel 
Track numbering refers to CD and digital releases of the album.
 Elton John – lead vocals, backing vocals, Roland RD-1000 digital piano (1, 3, 4, 10), synthesizers (2, 5, 6, 9), organ (2), acoustic piano (5, 7, 8)
 Fred Mandel – synthesizers
 Fred McFarlane – programming
 Davey Johnstone – electric guitar (1, 2, 3, 5–9), acoustic guitar (2, 4, 5, 6, 8, 10), backing vocals
 Pete Townshend – acoustic guitar (1)
 David Paton – bass
 Charlie Morgan – drums
 Ray Cooper – maracas (6-9), tambourine (6-9), timbales (6-9)
 Freddie Hubbard – trumpet (3), flugelhorn (3)
 Dee Murray – backing vocals 
 Nigel Olsson – backing vocals 
 Adrian Baker – additional backing vocals (10)
 Bruce Johnston – additional backing vocals (10)
 Carl Wilson – additional backing vocals (10)

Production 
 Producer – Chris Thomas
 Recorded and Engineered by Bill Price, Michael Mason and Paul Wertheimer.
 Assistant Engineer – Karl Lever
 Recorded at AIR Studios (London, England), Westside Studios (London, England), Circle Seven Recording and The Record Plant (Los Angeles, CA).
 Mixed at AIR Studios (London)
 Mastered by Tim Young at CBS, London.
 All songs published by Happenstance Ltd.
 Art Direction – David Costa
 Photography – Gered Mankowitz
 Wardrobe – Bob Stacey

1998 Reissue
 Producer and remastering supervision – Mike Gill
 Remixing and additional production on tracks 12, 13 & 14 – Shep Pettibone
 Additional remixing on tracks 12 & 13 by Steve Peck
 Remixing on track 14 by Daniel Abraham
 Editing on tracks 12 & 13 – Junior Vasquez
 Remastered by Gus Dudgeon, Mike Gill and Peter Mew.

Charts

Weekly charts

Year-end charts

Certifications and sales

}
}
}

}
}

References

External links

1988 albums
Elton John albums
Albums produced by Chris Thomas (record producer)
The Rocket Record Company albums